A list of films produced in Russia in 1996 (see 1996 in film).

1996

See also
 1996 in Russia

External links

1996
Russia
Films